Nebria suvorovi is a species of ground beetle from Nebriinae subfamily that can be found in Kazakhstan and  Kyrgyzstan.

References

suvorovi
Beetles described in 1976
Beetles of Asia
Insects of Central Asia